Thomas Kemp may refer to:

Thomas Read Kemp (1783–1844), English property developer and politician
Thomas Webster Kemp (1866–1928), Royal Navy admiral
Thomas Kemp of the Kemp baronets
Thomas Kemp (shipbuilder)

Tom Kemp (1921–1993), Marxist economic historian and political theorist
Tommy Kemp (1915–2004), England rugby union player